William Ward (August 1823 - 1887) was a jeweler, poet, and editor in Mississippi.

William and Charlotte Ward were his parents. He was a native New Englander born in Litchfield, Connecticut. His father was a jeweler and he had a brother and sister who wrote poetry. He moved to Columbus, Mississippi and worked as a jeweler with his elder brother. He moved to Macon, Mississippi in 1850. He married Emilie A. Whiffen, a teacher. They had three daughters and a son. She died and he raised them. He became editor of Macon's Beacon newspaper. He was a Whig before becoming a Democrat. He belonged to the Odd Fellows. He was buried in Macon. His poem "Come to the South" beckoned European immigrants. He also wrote of yellow fever and Ku Klux Klan death tolls. His poems were published in the Philadelphia American Courier and New Orleans Times Democrat as well as the Beacon

References

1823 births
1887 deaths
American jewellers
19th-century American male writers
19th-century American poets
American male poets
Poets from Mississippi
People from Litchfield, Connecticut
Editors of Mississippi newspapers
People from Macon, Mississippi
Members of the Odd Fellows
Mississippi Democrats
Mississippi Whigs